Art on Paper was a bi-monthly art magazine published from 1996 to 2009. The magazine's editorial scope included limited-edition prints and artists' books, drawings, photographs, and ephemera.

History
The magazine was founded in New York City in 1970 as The Print Collectors Newsletter by Paul Cummings, with Judith Goldman as editor. Within a year, Cummings sold it to Jacqueline Brody, who continued to publish it until 1996.

Art on Paper ceased publication in December 2009, having lost 60% of its advertising base in the Great Recession.

References

External links
 Art in Print

Visual arts magazines published in the United States
Bimonthly magazines published in the United States
Contemporary art magazines
Defunct magazines published in the United States
Magazines established in 1970
Magazines disestablished in 2009
Magazines published in New York City